The 1961 Lady Wigram Trophy was a motor race held at the Wigram Airfield Circuit on 21 January 1961. It was the tenth Lady Wigram Trophy to be held and was won by Jack Brabham in the Cooper T53.

Classification

References

Lady Wigram Trophy
Lady
January 1961 sports events in New Zealand